The 1976 European Weightlifting Championships were held at the Werner-Seelenbinder-Halle in Berlin, East Germany from April 3 to April 11, 1976. This was the 55th edition of the event. There were 151 men in action from 21 nations.

Medal summary
{| 
|-
!colspan=7|52 kg
|-
|Snatch
||| 107.5 kg
||| 102.5 kg
||| 100.0 kg
|-
|Clean & Jerk
||| 132.5 kg
||| 132.5 kg
||| 130.0 kg
|-bgcolor=#dfefff
|Total
||| 240.0 kg||| 235.0 kg
||| 230.0 kg|-
!colspan=7|56 kg
|-
|Snatch
||| 112.5 kg
||| 110.0 kg
||| 107.5 kg
|-
|Clean & Jerk
||| 145.0 kg
||| 145.0 kg
||| 142.5 kg
|-bgcolor=#dfefff
|Total||| 255.0 kg
||| 252.5 kg||| 250.0 kg
|-
!colspan=7|60 kg
|-
|Snatch
||| 125.0 kg
||| 125.0 kg
||| 122.5 kg
|-
|Clean & Jerk
||| 160.0 kg
||| 155.0 kg
||| 155.0 kg
|-bgcolor=#dfefff
|Total
||| 282.5 kg||| 280.0 kg
||| 277.5 kg|-
!colspan=7|67.5 kg
|-
|Snatch
||| 135.0 kg
||| 132.5 kg
||| 132.5 kg
|-
|Clean & Jerk
||| 172.5 kg
||| 170.0 kg
||| 170.0 kg
|-bgcolor=#dfefff
|Total||| 305.0 kg
||| 302.5 kg||| 297.5 kg
|-
!colspan=7|75 kg
|-
|Snatch
||| 150.0 kg
||| 150.0 kg
||| 147.5 kg
|-
|Clean & Jerk
||| 190.0 kg
||| 185.0 kg 
||| 182.5 kg
|-bgcolor=#dfefff
|Total
||| 340.0 kg||| 335.0 kg
| || 330.0 kg|-
!colspan=7|82.5 kg
|-
|Snatch
||| 167.5 kg
||| 165.0 kg
||| 165.0 kg
|-
|Clean & Jerk
||| 207.5 kg
||| 202.5 kg
||| 200.0 kg
|-bgcolor=#dfefff
|Total||| 367.5 kg
||| 365.0 kg||| 365.0 kg
|-
!colspan=7|90 kg
|-
|Snatch
||| 177.5 kg
||| 160.0 kg
||| 160.0 kg
|-
|Clean & Jerk
||| 220.0 kg
||| 200.0 kg
||| 195.0 kg
|-bgcolor=#dfefff
|Total
||| 397.5 kg||| 360.0 kg
||| 350.0 kg|-
!colspan=7|110 kg
|-
|Snatch
||| 185.0 kg
||| 172.5 kg
||| 170.0 kg
|-
|Clean & Jerk
||| 230.0 kg
||| 227.5 kg
||| 225.0 kg
|-bgcolor=#dfefff
|Total||| 415.0 kg
||| 400.0 kg||| 395.0 kg
|- 
!colspan=7|+110 kg
|-
|Snatch
||| 195.0 kg
||| 180.0 kg
||| 180.0 kg
|-
|Clean & Jerk
||| 252.5 kg
||| 235.0 kg
||| 230.0 kg
|-bgcolor=#dfefff
|Total
||| 432.5 kg||| 430.0 kg
||| 410.0 kg|}

Medal table
Ranking by Big''' (Total result) medals

References
Results (Chidlovski.net)
 М. Л. Аптекарь. «Тяжёлая атлетика. Справочник.» — М.: «Физкультура и спорт», 1983. — 416 с. 

European Weightlifting Championships
European Weightlifting Championships
European Weightlifting Championships
International weightlifting competitions hosted by Germany
Sports competitions in East Berlin
European Weightlifting Championships
1970s in Berlin